() is a Japanese electronics manufacturer. TEAC was created by the merger of the Tokyo Television Acoustic Company, founded in 1953, and the Tokyo Electro-Acoustic Company, founded in 1956.

Overview

TEAC has four divisions:
TASCAM - consumer to professional audio products, mostly recording
ESOTERIC - High-end consumer audio products
TEAC Consumer Electronics - Mass market audio products
Data Storage and Disk Publishing Products - Floppy drives, DVD and CD recorders and drives, MP3 players & NAS storage

TEAC is known for its audio equipment, and was a primary manufacturer of high-end audio equipment in the 1970s and 1980s. During that time, TEAC produced reel-to-reel machines, cassette decks, CD players, turntables and amplifiers.

TEAC produced an audio cassette with tape hubs that resembled reel-to-reel tape reels in appearance. Many manufacturers at the time used these TEAC cassettes in advertisements of their tape decks because the TEAC cassettes looked more professional than standard audio cassettes, and because reel-to-reel tape recordings were known to be of higher quality than cassette recordings.

History 
The company that eventually became the TEAC corporation was founded in August 1953. Originally named the Tokyo Television Acoustic Company, it employed Katsuma Tani, a former aviation and aeronautics engineer, who established a reputation as a highly qualified creator of audio equipment.

In 1956, his brother, Tomoma Tani, brought home a hand-made, 3-motor, 3-head stereo tape recorder. This sparked Katsuma's interest in reel-to-reel tape recorders. Confident they could engineer a better tape recorder, the Tani brothers founded the Tokyo Electro-Acoustic Company on 24 December 1956.

The Tokyo Television Acoustic Company and the Tokyo Electro-Acoustic Company were merged to create the TEAC corporation, taking the initials of the latter company as its name.  The main focus of the new company was to design and manufacture tape recorders.

In 1969 TEAC produced the first consumer four-track reel-to-reel tape recorders capable of playing pre-recorded Quadraphonic open reel tapes (Q4). This was the first format to play high quality four-channel quadraphonic recordings in the home. In order to keep costs affordable, home machines used slower tape speeds and narrower track widths compared to similar professional machines. Quadraphonic sound was not widely adopted by the public and the Q4 format died by the late 1970s.

In 1972 TEAC introduced the first consumer grade four-track reel-to-reel recorders with Simul-Sync that were capable of overdubbing. Musicians were able to use these products as the basis of home recording studios. With this advancement many consumers created sophisticated home demo recordings for the first time. TEAC, and its TASCAM division, as well as other manufacturers sold thousands of these machines to musicians well into the 1990s.

Some of TEAC's most popular home multitrack recorders with Simul-Sync:
 The A3340 4-track recorder with 10.5" tape reels, 7½ and 15 ips speeds w/ manual direction toggle lever
 The A2340 4-track recorder with 7" tape reels, 3¾ and 7½ ips speeds w/ manual direction toggle lever
 The A3340S 4-track recorder with 10.5" tape reels, 7½ and 15 ips speeds, the 's' designation indicates an improved tape transport mechanism with solenoid control
 The A2340S 4-track recorder with 7" tape reels, 3¾ and 7½ ips speeds, the 's' designation indicates an improved tape transport mechanism with solenoid control

In 2013, Gibson bought a majority stake in the company, giving it 54.42% of the company. After Gibson's bankruptcy in 2018, TEAC announced that they would continue to operate on their own.

Computer tape memory systems 
In May 1961 TEAC entered into a licensing agreement with IBM to create magnetic tape memory systems.

References

External links

TEAC Worldwide 
TEAC North America 
Hajime Yamaguchi Interview NAMM Oral History Library (2005)

Audio equipment manufacturers of Japan
Manufacturing companies based in Tokyo
Companies listed on the Tokyo Stock Exchange
Consumer electronics brands
Portable audio player manufacturers
Phonograph manufacturers
Loudspeaker manufacturers
Electronics companies established in 1953
Japanese companies established in 1953
Japanese brands
Electronics companies of Japan